Dreams is a 2016 Nepali romantic comedy film starring actress Samragyee RL Shah and  actor Anmol K.C. The film was blatantly inspired by British-American film If Only.

Plot
The film starts with the death of Aveer's father while trying to save a kid from a truck accident. Aveer is a millionaire, and claims that he has no interest in love. Some boys chase a girl, played by VJ Sandhya KC, who successfully escapes from them and enters a basketball ring, where she encounters the boss of the gang, and they try to rape her. At the critical moment, Aveer enters the scene and saves her by defeating them.

Aveer attends his first conference in his own Fulbari Hotel and Spa in Pokhara, which his father had owned. Aveer now becomes the chairperson of the resort and spa. On the same night, Aveer and his friends drink in a bar club. Aveer sees Kavya dancing gracefully, so he tries to flirt with her. But little did he knew, she isn't the type of girl who gets wooed easily. She humiliates him in front of her friends in public. They two encounter each other several times followed by words of hatred and repulsion towards each other. Surprisingly, their hatred changes into love. Kavya works as an assistant manager in his resort and since then they start to learn about each other and spend time together. Kavya is kind and has deep affection for an orphanage.

One day, Aveer had a dream where Kavya dies in a car accident. He claimed that his dreams always come true. He remembers seeing his father's death in a dream which eventually happened in reality. After seeing a doctor, he gets advice to stay away from traffic and cars, and the location where the accident had taken place in his dream.

Aveer and Kavya go to a silent place where they get cosy and eventually make out. They stay there for a couple of weeks until Aveer's depression  relieves. On Kavya's birthday, they stop at a place where Kavya goes to buy roses. Kavya comes out with roses in her hands and gives one to a kid. It was the same place which Aveer had seen the  car accident in his mysterious dream. Aveer realizes this, and when Kavya crosses the road, Aveer sacrifices his life and saves her from an accident.

Aveer's death takes place on Kavya's birthday. The film ends in a scene where Kavya sings a song in a crowd, which was her dream.

Cast
 Samragyee RL Shah as Kavya
 Anmol K.C. as Aveer 
 Sandhya KC as Alvira

Track listing

Accolades

References

2010s Nepali-language films
Nepalese romantic comedy films
Films shot in Pokhara
2016 romantic comedy films